The Velikaya (also Большая Bolshaya, Онемен Onemen; , Meynyveem), is a river in Chukotka Autonomous Okrug in Russia.
 
The name of the river was given by the Russian inhabitants of the village of Markovo. Velikaya (Великая) means "great" in Russian and Bolshaya (Большая) translates to "big". The Velikaya and its tributaries belong to the Chukotka Autonomous Okrug. One of the native names of this river is Echinku and in some documents referring to this river in Soviet times, it was referred to as Velikaya-Echinku.

Course
The Velikaya is formed in the eastern slopes of the Southern Mayn Range of the Koryak Mountains at the confluence of rivers Kuimveyem and Kylvygeyvaam. It heads northeastwards through mountainous terrain, descending into the southern end of the Anadyr Lowlands into Onemen Bay, part of the Anadyr River estuary of the Bering Sea at the Gulf of Anadyr. The Rarytkin Range rises along the left bank of the river in its middle and lower course. 

There is a small populated place in the area close to its estuary also named Velikaya. The Tamvathey (Тамватней) mercury mining town was located in the basin of the river, just south of its middle course. It was abandoned in 1984.

Fauna
Beluga whales are common in its estuarine waters.

See also
List of rivers of Russia

References

External links
   

Rivers of Chukotka Autonomous Okrug
Drainage basins of the Bering Sea
Koryak Mountains